The Vietnam women's national under-20 football team represents Vietnam in international football competitions at the qualifications of AFC U-19 Women's Championship and possible final tournaments if they qualify, as well as any other under-19 women's international football tournaments. It is governed by the Vietnam Football Federation.

Results and fixtures
Legend

2022

2023

Players

Current squad
The following 23 players were called up for the 2019 AFC U-19 Women's Championship in November 2019.

Competitive record

AFC U-20 Women's Asian Cup

AFF U-19 Women's Championship

References

u20
Vietnam
Women's football in Vietnam